The Vuelta a España is an important cycling race (one of the Grand Tours). The first Vuelta a España was in 1935. As the Vuelta a España is a stage race, a classification based on times is calculated after every stage. The cyclist with the lowest time after a stage is the leader of the general classification after that stage. A jersey is given to that cyclist, which the cyclist wears during the next stage. From 1999 to 2009, this jersey had a golden color and was named the golden jersey. From 2010 onwards, the leader's jersey was red. It has also been black and white at different points in the Vuelta's history.

Although the leader of the classification after a stage gets the leader's jersey, he is not considered the winner of that jersey, only the wearer. Only after the final stage, the wearer of the leader's jersey is considered the winner, and therefore the winner of the Vuelta a España.

Since the first Vuelta a España in 1935, there have been 1,491 stages, up to and including the Stage 12 of the 2021 Vuelta a España The race leader following each stage has been awarded a leader's jersey.

Although the number of stages is 1,491, there have been 1,492 leader's jerseys awarded, because after the first stage of the 1948 Vuelta a España, Bernardo Ruiz and Julián Berrendero shared the lead and both received the leader's jersey. As of 2021, 1,492 leader's jerseys have been awarded in the Vuelta a España to 226 different riders.

Jerseys per rider
Key:

In previous Vueltas a España, sometimes a stage was split in two. On such occasions, only the cyclist leading at the end of the day is counted. The "Leader's jerseys" column gives the number of days that the cyclist wore the leader's jersey, the "Vuelta wins" column gives the number of times that the cyclist won the Vuelta. The next three columns indicate the number of times the rider won the points classification, the mountains classification, and the years in which the rider lead the general classification, with bold years indicating an overall Vuelta win.

For example: Alex Zülle has spent 48 days in the leader's jersey, and won the overall classification two times. He wore the leader's jersey in the Vueltas of 1993, 1996, 1997 and 2000, of which he won the 1996 and 1997 Vueltas.

Jerseys per country
The leader's jersey has been awarded to 23 different countries since 1935. In the table below, "Jerseys" indicates the number of leader's jerseys that were given to cyclists of each country. "Vuelta wins" stands for the number of Vuelta wins by cyclists of that country, "Points" for the number of times the points classification was won by a cyclist of that country and "KoM" for the number of times the mountains classification was won by a cyclist of that country. "Combo'" shows the winners of the combination classification, This classification is calculated by adding the numeral ranks of each cyclist in the general, points, and mountains classifications (a rider must have a score in all). 
The "Most recent" column shows the cyclist of the country that wore the leader's jersey most recently. The "Different holders" column gives the number of different cyclists of the country that wore the leader's jersey.

Stage wins per country 

Riders from 33 countries have won at least one stage in the Vuelta. Tables are correct as of 26 August 2021

Detailed table

See also
Yellow jersey statistics (for a list of leaders in the Tour de France)
Pink jersey statistics (for a list of leaders in the Giro d'Italia)
List of Vuelta a España winners

External links
Statistics on the official website

Statistics
Cycling records and statistics